Khairlanjichya Mathyawar is an Indian Marathi language film directed by Raju Meshram and produced by Padmashree Kalpana Saroj. The film starring Kishori Shahane Vij, Anant Jog and Milind Shinde and Music by Anand Modak. The film was released on 7 February 2014.

Synopsis 
The film was based on the Khairlanji massacre that took place in a village in Vidarbha in 2006. The wife and children of Dalit farmer Bhayyalal Bhotmange of this village were brutally murdered. The film Khairlanji' is based on this very gruesome murder.

Cast 
 Kishori Shahane Vij as Surekha
 Dipak Balraj Vij
 Anant Jog
 Tukaram Bidkar
 Milind Shinde
 Vilas Ujawane
 Pratiksha Mungekar
 Dr. Sandeep Patil
 Akash Gharat
 Geeta Shinde

Soundtrack

Critical response 
Khairlanjichya Mathyawar received mixed reviews from critics. A reviewer from The Indian Express wrote "While, the story and screenplay is taut and does not slack, Meshram’s attempt to string the various incidents together in a fortright manner, gives one the feel of watching a documentary". A reviewer from Divya Marathi wrote "Although the story is strong, the cinematography lacks grandeur due to poor editing and editing".

Controversy 
The petition seeking a ban on the release of the film was filed by Bhayyalal Bhotmange himself and Ravi Shende, convener of Akhil Bharatiya Dhammasena. He said that the reason for filing the petition was that Bhotmange's personality was wrongly presented in the film He also expressed the opinion that the image of his daughter is tarnished due to some scenes in it. Of course, he had not objected to the entire film. But he also expressed his regret for not showing the film before the exhibition. After this petition, the court canceled the certificate given by the Censor Board and banned the film. Further, the Nagpur Bench of the Bombay High Court also upheld the ban on the film.

References

External links
 
 

2014 films
2010s Marathi-language films
Indian drama films